Several vessels have been named Highland Chief:

 was launched at Calcutta in 1796 and made two voyages for the British East India Company before a French privateer captured her in 1802. 
Highland Chief, of 306 or 380 tons (bm), was launched at Calcutta in 1806. On 5 October 1807 the French frigate  captured Highland Chief, Makepiece, master, and took her into Mauritius. She had been carrying 1,000 sacks of wheat and rice, and her value as a prize was 158,796.76 French francs.

See also

Citations and references
Citations

References
 
 
 Roman, Alain (2007) Robert Surcouf et ses frères. 

Ship names